Thomas M. Rasmussen is a retired member of the Seattle City Council. He was first elected in 2003 and elected for a second term in 2007. From 2004 to 2007, he was chair of the Housing, Human Services & Health Committee, vice chair of the Urban Development & Planning Committee, and a member of the Transportation Committee. From 2008 to 2009, he was chair of the Parks & Seattle Center Committee, the vice chair of the Culture, Civil Rights, Health and Personnel Committee, and the Labor Policy Committee. He was also chair of the Transportation Committee, vice chair of the Economic Resiliency and Regional Relations, and a member of Parks and Seattle Center Committee.

Rasmussen holds a bachelor's degree in political science from Pacific Lutheran University and a J.D. from Valparaiso University.

References 

Seattle City Council members
Valparaiso University alumni
Gay politicians
Pacific Lutheran University alumni
Living people
American LGBT city council members
LGBT people from Washington (state)
Year of birth missing (living people)